Dolenji Maharovec ( or) is a village in the Municipality of Šentjernej in southeastern Slovenia. The area is part of the traditional region of Lower Carniola. It is now included in the Southeast Slovenia Statistical Region.

There are a number of Early Iron Age tumuli in the woods to the east of the settlement.

References

External links
Dolenji Maharovec on Geopedia

Populated places in the Municipality of Šentjernej
Tumuli